Emmanuel "Maning" H. Borlaza (November 5, 1935 – October 11, 2017) was a Filipino movie screenwriter and director.

Early life
Born Emmanuel H. Borlaza on November 5, 1935, in Manila.

Career
Borlaza co-wrote and starred in the 1965 film Iginuhit ng Tadhana (The Ferdinand E. Marcos Story).

Borlaza has directed more than 20 films which starred Vilma Santos, including Dyesebel, Darna and the Giants, Lipad, Darna, Lipad!

He also helmed the films of Sharon Cuneta, namely Bukas Luluhod ang Mga Tala, Bituing Walang Ningning, and Dapat Ka Bang Mahalin?

Borlaza directed Eva Fonda 16 starring Alma Moreno and Snooky Serna's Blusang Itim. He was also the director of Dyesebel starring Charlene Gonzales in 1996.

Aside from being vice chairman of the Movie and Television Review and Classification Board, Borlaza also became chairperson of the Directors' Guild of the Philippines, Inc.

Borlaza's last directorial stint was for the film To Saudi with Love starring Dawn Zulueta, Alice Dixon, and Tonton Gutierrez in 1997.

Filmography

Film director

TV Director

Screenplay

Story

Movie Writer

TV Writer

References

1935 births
2017 deaths
Burials at the Loyola Memorial Park
Filipino film directors
Filipino screenwriters
Filipino television directors
People from Manila